Jayanta Behera (born 25 December 1986) is an Indian first-class cricketer who plays for Odisha.

References

External links
 

1986 births
Living people
Indian cricketers
Odisha cricketers
People from Cuttack
Cricketers from Odisha